Facultad de Derecho-Julieta Lanteri Station is a station on Line H of the Buenos Aires Underground which opened on 17 May 2018 as a one-station extension from Las Heras. It currently serves as the northern terminus of the line until it is extended to Retiro. It is located next to the University of Buenos Aires Faculty of Law and the City's Exhibition and Conventions Centre and it is near the Recoleta Cemetery and Fine arts museum.

The station was previously going to be located closer to the cemetery, however works were canceled there due to concerns that it would affect the natural beauty and architecture of the surrounding area. It was then moved further north to its present location.

A new railway station (Retiro Norte) is also planned at the site of the underground station, which would create connections with the Mitre Line, San Martín Line and Belgrano Norte Line commuter rail services.

In 2019, the station was renamed Facultad de Derecho-Julieta Lanteri after a public vote held by the city's government.

References

External links

Buenos Aires Underground stations
Railway stations opened in 2018